Stan Thomas may refer to:
 Stan Thomas (Australian footballer) (1892–1958), Australian rules footballer
Stan Thomas (coach) (1893–1974), Australian rules football coach and administrator
 Stan Thomas (baseball) (born 1949), former baseball pitcher
 Stan Thomas (American football) (born 1968), former American football player
 Stan Thomas (association footballer), inside forward for Tranmere Rovers